Kenneth Leslie Wishart (18 November 1908 – 18 October 1972) was a West Indian international cricketer who played in one Test match against England in 1934–35.

1908 births
1972 deaths
West Indies Test cricketers
Sportspeople from Georgetown, Guyana
Guyanese cricketers
Guyana cricketers